Oliver Keith Baker is an American experimental particle physicist and astrophysicist, best known for his work on the Higgs boson and dark matter. In 2002, he won the Edward Alexander Bouchet Award of the American Physical Society: "For his contribution to nuclear and particle physics; for building the infrastructure to do these measurements; and for being active in outreach activities, both locally and nationally."

Early life and education

Oliver Keith Baker was born in McGehee, Arkansas in 1959 to parents Oliver and Yvonne Baker, and grew up in Memphis, Tennessee.

Keith Baker received his B.S. in Physics from the Massachusetts Institute of Technology (MIT) in 1981. Baker completed both his M.S. in physics and mathematics in 1984 and his Ph.D in physics in 1987 from Stanford working on experimental nuclear physics.

Career

Baker completed a post-doc at Los Alamos National Laboratory from 1986 to 1988 conducting research on muon catalyzed fusion. After his post-doc, Baker joined Hampton University in 1989 as an assistant professor in the physics department with a joint appointment as a staff scientist at Thomas Jefferson National Accelerator Facility. In 2002, Baker received an Endowed University Professorship from Hampton University for his contributions to experimental nuclear and particle physics research as well as his work in outreach activities.

In 2006, Baker began professorship at Yale University where he was the first tenured African American faculty member in the physics department. Baker is a member of the ATLAS Collaboration, which in 2012 discovered the Higgs boson predicted by the Standard Model. Baker also models dark sector analogues of Standard Model photons called paraphotons, which may be experimentally supported by observing the spectrum of ultra-high-energy cosmic rays from BL Lacertae objects.

In 2010, Baker became director of Yale’s A. W. Wright Nuclear Structure Laboratory, which includes state-of-the-art facilities for the study of neutrinos, dark matter and fundamental physics. In February 2021 he was appointed to Yale's D. Allan Bromley Professorship of Physics.

Awards and honors

 Elmbers Innes Award from the National Society of Black Physicists.
US ATLAS Distinguished Researcher 
E. L. Hamm, Sr. Distinguished Teaching Award 
2002 - Edward Alexander Bouchet Award from the American Physical Society.
2006 - Inducted into Arkansas Black Hall of Fame

References

External links
 Faculty webpage of Keith Baker at Yale University

1959 births
Living people
African-American scientists
Yale University faculty
Hampton University faculty
People from McGehee, Arkansas
American astrophysicists
Massachusetts Institute of Technology alumni
21st-century African-American people
20th-century African-American people
African-American physicists